Cecilia Akeng Ñengono or Cecilia Akeng Nguema (born 1 January 1996 or 8 November 2002) is an Equatorial Guinean footballer who plays as a defender for Huracanes FC and the Equatorial Guinea women's national team.

Club career
Akeng has played for Estrellas de E'Waiso Ipola, Estrellas del Sur and Deportivo Evinayong in Equatorial Guinea.

International career
Akeng capped for Equatorial Guinea at senior level during the 2018 Africa Women Cup of Nations, playing in three matches. She also represented the country at under-20 level at the 2019 African Games.

References

External links

Year of birth missing (living people)
Date of birth uncertain
Living people
Equatoguinean women's footballers
Women's association football defenders
Equatorial Guinea women's international footballers
Competitors at the 2019 African Games
African Games competitors for Equatorial Guinea